Vakhtang Maisuradze (born 11 March 1987 in Tskhinvali) is a Georgian rugby union player who plays as a lock.

He played for Polish club Pogoń Siedlce (2008–2009) before moving to France, where he played for Saint-Nazaire and Albi, among others.

He has 20 caps for Georgia, with 3 tries scored, 15 points on aggregate. He had his first game on 5 February 2011, in a 62-3 win over Ukraine, in Tbilisi, for the Six Nations B. He was called for the 2011 Rugby World Cup, where he played in all the four games without scoring.

References

External links

1987 births
Living people
Rugby union players from Georgia (country)
Expatriate rugby union players from Georgia (country)
Rugby union locks
Rugby Club Vannes players
People from Tskhinvali
Georgia international rugby union players